NBA Inside Stuff is a television program previously aired on NBC from 1990 to 2002, then on ABC and NBA TV, featuring behind the scenes activities of NBA players. The program also includes features on fitness and fundamentals of basketball. Previously hosted by Ahmad Rashad (and once co-hosted by Julie Moran, and then Willow Bay) and Summer Sanders, the show was later hosted by former NBA star Grant Hill and Kristen Ledlow.

Overview
NBA Inside Stuff served as a sort of recap and analysis show reviewing the week's previous games in the NBA, complete with top plays and special moments. The hosts would also interview top NBA players outside of game situations, often discussing issues relevant to them.

The show first aired on October 27, 1990 and ended on January 15, 2006. After a seven-year hiatus, NBA TV brought back Inside Stuff with new hosts and a new look. The revamped show began airing on November 2, 2013 on NBA TV and concluded in 2016.

Broadcast history
NBA Inside Stuff was usually the bridge program for NBC between TNBC (or, in its first two seasons, its Saturday morning cartoon lineup) and Saturday afternoon programming, usually sports. In the late 1990s, the program received some adaptation in order to meet the FCC's educational and informational requirements. In 2002, ABC took over the show from NBC after the latter network's contract with the NBA as the exclusive network rights-holder had expired.

When it moved to ABC in the fall of 2002, it aired at the tail end of the network's ABC Kids Saturday morning block, serving as a bridge between that and their afternoon sports programming (occasionally being moved to Sundays during college football season).

For its first two years there, the show suffered from a decline in viewership. When asked why he thought the show had gotten off track, Rashad had said, “because ABC locked us into a timeslot that didn’t fit the content, causing the show to suffer in the ratings.”  Many of the 18- to 34-year-old viewers who were drawn to the show on NBC throughout the ’90s failed to follow it to its new home on ABC. In the fall of 2004, as an effort to boost ratings, the show was moved to Sunday afternoons, still leading into sports programming.
 
NBA Inside Stuff last aired on January 15, 2006. It was then replaced with the similarly themed NBA Access with Ahmad Rashad (which ran on ABC until 2011). As its name implies, Rashad was the host. Reruns of Inside Stuff were moved at that time to NBA TV.

In 2013, NBA TV announced that after a seven-year hiatus, NBA Inside Stuff would return with Grant Hill and Kristen Ledlow as hosts, with Shaq as a sometimes fill-in host. The commercial for the then-newly resurrected NBA Inside Stuff later aired on NBA TV. This version ended in 2016.

Hosts
Ahmad Rashad (1990–2004)
Julie Moran (1990–1991)
Willow Bay (1991–1998)
Summer Sanders (1998-2004)
Grant Hill (2013-2016)
Kristen Ledlow (2013-2016)
Shaquille O'Neal (fill-in host) (2013-2016)

See also
Run It Back – a show related to Inside Stuff, aired on Cartoon Network.

References

External links

TNBC
ABC Kids (TV programming block)
1990 American television series debuts
2006 American television series endings
2013 American television series debuts
2016 American television series endings
1990s American children's television series
2000s American children's television series
2010s American children's television series
American Broadcasting Company original programming
English-language television shows
NBC original programming
Inside Stuff
NBA TV original programming
American sports television series
American television series revived after cancellation